Auchmis is a genus of moths of the family Noctuidae.

Description
Its eyes are naked and without lashes. The proboscis is well developed. Palpi porrect (extending forward), where the second joint evenly scaled and third joint prominent. Antennae ciliated in male. Thorax tuftless. Abdomen with small dorsal tufts on proximal segments. Mid tibia very rarely spined. Wings with crenulate cilia. Hindwings with obsolescent vein 5.

Species
 Auchmis composita Plante, 1989
 Auchmis crassicornis Boursin, 1960
 Auchmis curva (Staudinger, 1889)
 Auchmis detersa (Esper, 1791)
 Auchmis detersina (Staudinger, 1896)
 Auchmis hannemanni Plante, 1989
 Auchmis imbi Ronkay & Varga, 1993
 Auchmis incognita Ronkay & Varga, 1990
 Auchmis indica (Walker, 1865)
 Auchmis inextricata (Moore, 1881)
 Auchmis isolata Hacker, 1999
 Auchmis manfredi Hreblay & Ronkay, 1998
 Auchmis martini Ronkay & Varga, 1997
 Auchmis mongolica (Staudinger, 1896)
 Auchmis opulenta Hreblay & Ronkay, 1998
 Auchmis paucinotata (Hampson, 1894)
 Auchmis peterseni (Christoph, 1887)
 Auchmis poliorhiza (Hampson, 1902)
 Auchmis restricta (Sukhareva, 1976)
 Auchmis ronkayi Hacker & Weigert, 1990
 Auchmis saga (Butler, 1878)
 Auchmis subdetersa (Staudinger, 1895)

References

 

Acronictinae